In human anatomy, inferior epigastric vein are 1-2 veins accompanying the inferior epigastric artery. They drain into the external iliac vein just proximal to the inguinal ligament.

Additional images

See also 
Terms for anatomical location
Hesselbach's triangle

References

External links
  - "Anterior Abdominal wall: Blood Vessels in the Rectus sheath"
  - "Incisions and the contents of the rectus sheath."

Veins of the torso